The SEIU District 1199 New England is a local union of the Service Employees International Union in the United States. As of September 2022, it represents over nearly 24,000 health care workers in the New England area, specifically in the states of Connecticut and Rhode Island.

In Connecticut the union is closely identified with liberal Democratic politicians such as Governor Dannel Malloy and has clashed frequently with fiscally conservative Republicans such as former Governor John G. Rowland as well as the Yankee Institute for Public Policy, a free-market think tank.

References

McAlevey, Jane. "Labor Needs an Outside Strategy." Dissent, vol. 68, no. 3, Summer, 2021, pp. 77-79. ProQuest, https://augie.idm.oclc.org/login?url=https://www.proquest.com/magazines/labor-needs-outside-strategy/docview/2622297460/se-2.

External links

Service Employees International Union
Trade unions in Connecticut
Organizations based in Hartford, Connecticut

McAlevey, J. (2003). IT TAKES A COMMUNITY: Building unions from the outside in. New Labor Forum, 12(1), 23-32,134-135. Retrieved from https://augie.idm.oclc.org/login?url=https://www.proquest.com/scholarly-journals/takes-community-building-unions-outside/docview/237234171/se-2

"National Right to Work Legal Defense Foundation: White Plains Hospital Workers Seek Vote to Remove Unpopular SEIU 1199 Union from Workplace." Targeted News Service, Feb 11, 2022. ProQuest, https://augie.idm.oclc.org/login?url=https://www.proquest.com/wire-feeds/national-right-work-legal-defense-foundation/docview/2627535548/se-2

"National Right to Work Legal Defense Foundation: White Plains Hospital Workers Seek Vote to Remove Unpopular SEIU 1199 Union from Workplace." Targeted News Service, Feb 11, 2022. ProQuest, https://augie.idm.oclc.org/login?url=https://www.proquest.com/wire-feeds/national-right-work-legal-defense-foundation/docview/2627535548/se-2.